Slovenly Recordings is an independent record label founded by Pete Menchetti in 2002. The label is based in Reno, Nevada, and has offices in Pennsylvania, Berlin, and Tokyo.

History

In 2002 Pete Menchetti formed Slovenly Recordings after the dissolution of his previous record label, 702 Records. Menchetti started Slovenly with a mission to release garage rock and psych influenced punk rock from around the globe. The Reno, Nevada headquarters shares space with Menchetti’s other business venture, Sticker Guy.

In early 2017, Slovenly Recordings became the North American supplier of Crypt Records. The label also has three imprints: Black Gladiator, which is run by Slovenly label manager DJ Bazooka Joe; Mondo Mongo, which features non-English speaking bands; and I Shit in the Milk, featuring trash bands from Spain.

Current Artists

Acid Baby Jesus
Andy California
The Anomalys
Avenue Z
Bazooka
Biznaga
The Blind Shake
Brad Pott
The Cavemen
Choke Chains
The Dirtiest
Dirty Fences
Duchess Says
Gay Anniversary
Gino and the Goons
Hellshovel

The Hipshakes
J.C. Satàn
Komodina 3
Las Ardillas
Les Lullies
Lo-Lite
Los Vigilantes
Magnetix
The Monsieurs
Moral Panic
Moron's Morons
Mouthbreathers
Nightmare Boyzzz
The Okmoniks
Paint Fumes
The Penetrators
Personal and the Pizzas
Pronto

The Psyched
Puff!
Pypy
Red Mass
The Rippers
Scraper
Sick Thoughts
The Spits
Stalins of Sound
Subsonics
Sultan Bathery
Thee Oops
Tommy & the Commies
Useless Eaters
Van Buren Wheels
Wau Y Los Arrghs!!!
Wet Ones
Xenu & the Thetans

Past Artists and Associated Acts

Black Lips
Greg Cartwright
Hollywood Sinners
Nobunny
Reigning Sound

See also
 List of record labels

Footnotes

External links
 Slovenly Recordings official website

Garage rock record labels
Punk record labels